The cold miner bee (Andrena frigida) is a species of miner bee in the family Andrenidae. Another common name for this species is the frigid miner. It is found in North America.

References

Further reading

External links

 

frigida
Articles created by Qbugbot
Insects described in 1853